Matthew Clackson (born April 26, 1985) is a Canadian-born American former professional ice hockey right winger who played six seasons in the American Hockey League (AHL) for five different teams. His father, Kim Clackson, played in the National Hockey League (NHL) for the Pittsburgh Penguins and Quebec Nordiques.

Playing career
Clackson attended Peters Township High School in McMurray, Pennsylvania, and played for the school's varsity ice hockey team, winning two Pennsylvania State AA Ice Hockey Championships. He was a teammate of NHLer Christian Hanson at Peters Township. After high school, he played two seasons of Junior A with the Chicago Steel of the United States Hockey League (USHL) and was selected 215th overall in the 2005 NHL Entry Draft by the Philadelphia Flyers.

Following his draft, he spent three seasons with Western Michigan University of the NCAA circuit. After his junior season, he decided to forgo his senior year by signing with the Flyers on March 19, 2008. That same day, he was assigned to the Philadelphia Phantoms of the American Hockey League (AHL); he played two games with the AHL team to close out the 2008–09 season. Clackson then played three full seasons with the Philadelphia/Adirondack Phantoms, re-signing with the Flyers following the 2009–10 season.

On June 7, 2011, Clackson was packaged into a trade that sent him, a 2012 third round draft pick and future considerations, to the Phoenix Coyotes, in exchange for goaltender Ilya Bryzgalov. Failing to come to terms with the Coyotes on a new contract, he became an unrestricted free agent on July 1. Several months later, he was invited to the Vancouver Canucks on a tryout basis during the team's training camp.

On July 14, 2012, Clackson signed a one-year deal with the Washington Capitals. He will earn $525,000 at the NHL level and $75,000 at the AHL level.

On April 2, 2013, he was traded from Washington to the Phoenix Coyotes in return of Joel Rechlicz.

NHL video explanation
During the 2011-12 pre-season, Clackson was illegally hit from behind by Calgary Flames forward Pierre-Luc Letourneau-Leblond. In handing down a five-game suspension against Letourneau-Leblond, Brendan Shanahan, the new head of NHL discipline, posted on the NHL website video of the hit on Clackson to illustrate his ruling - the first of what would become Shanahan's trademark video explanations.

Career statistics

References

External links

1985 births
Adirondack Phantoms players
American men's ice hockey left wingers
Canadian emigrants to the United States
Canadian ice hockey right wingers
Chicago Wolves players
Hershey Bears players
Ice hockey people from Saskatchewan
Living people
Philadelphia Flyers draft picks
Philadelphia Phantoms players
Portland Pirates players
People from Washington County, Pennsylvania
Sportspeople from Saskatoon
Western Michigan Broncos men's ice hockey players